Arizona Range News is a weekly newspaper in Willcox, Arizona, United States, which started its publication in 1882. It is owned and published by Wick Communications.

References

External links
 Official website

Newspapers published in Arizona
Weekly newspapers published in the United States
Publications established in 1882
1882 establishments in Arizona Territory